Artashes Avetyan (Persian: آرتاشس آودیان; born 14 August 1942) is an Iranian Armenian singer and musician.

Biography 

Avetyan was born in Tehran, Iran. At a young age, he played football and played in Tehran's Taj Team (now known as Esteghlal F.C.). At the age of 14, he learned to play the guitar, with the help of German musician Erwin More. During his school years, he often toured Iranian cities playing in a musical band. His song teacher, Aram Sargsyan, was a tenor, who sang with the famous Russian bass-singer Feodor Chaliapin.

In 1963, his family moved to Yerevan, in Soviet Armenia. For 23 years, he was a soloist with the Radio and Television Symphony Orchestra of Armenia under direction of Melik Mavisakalyan. For 5 years, he was with the State Variety Orchestra of Armenia, conducted by People's Artist of the Soviet Union and the Armenian SSR - Konstantin Orbelyan.

Avetyan had recorded around 250 songs, which included: Sirun Aghchik Hayastani (Beautiful Armenian Girl); Ov Sirun Sirun (Oh Beautiful Beautiful); Yeh Negah (One Look) and Yerevan. Not only did he sing in Armenian, but also sang in Russian and Persian.

He was married to Armenian singer Lola Khomyants. The couple would sing duets together before their divorce in 1990. Later in the same year, Avetyan moved to the United States, where he would perform in clubs. He also engaged in book publishing with his second wife Zhuliet Gevorgyan. These books were used in Armenian schools.

References

1942 births
Living people
Iranian composers
Iranian guitarists
Singers from Tehran
Iranian pop singers
20th-century singers
Iranian male singers
Persian-language singers
Iranian emigrants to Armenia
20th-century Iranian male singers
Iranian people of Armenian descent
Iranian emigrants to the Soviet Union
Iranian expatriates in the United States